The UAAP Season 79 Men's Football Final took place on 7 May 2017 at the Rizal Memorial Stadium.It Will be the final match of the UAAP Season 79 football tournaments of the UAAP Season 79.It was contested between the Ateneo Blue Eagles and the FEU Tamaraws.Ateneo won 1-0
,with Jarvey Gayoso's goal at the 39th minute to claim their seventh UAAP Football Championship title.

Route to the Final
The Final Four of the tournament are #1 seed Ateneo Blue Eagles, #2 UP Fighting Maroons, #3 FEU Tamaraws, and #4 UST Growling Tigers who just finished from the Elimination Round. The number 1 seeded team Ateneo Blue Eagles beat the #4 team UST Growling Tigers in the score of 2-1.And in the other match, the number 3 seeded team FEU Tamaraws beat the defending champions and the number 2 seeded team UP Fighting Maroons in the score of 1-2.That makes Ateneo Blue Eagles meet the FEU Tamaraws in the championship match.

Team standings

Playoffs

Semifinals

Match
Jarvey Gayoso took the lead for Ateneo at 1-0 in the 39th minute with a winning left-foot attack that finally penetrated FEU's defense after a deflation to give Ateneo a good end of the first half. In the second half, the FEU Tamaraws had several offsides and freekicks but it did not change the momentum of the match and Ateneo claimed their seventh title of the UAAP Football Championship. Ateneo last tasted the championship victory in 2012.

Details

Match rules
90 minutes.
30 minutes of extra-time if necessary.
Penalty shoot-out if scores still level.
Seven named substitutes.
Maximum of three substitutions.

Broadcasting
The match was broadcast live on ABS-CBN Sports+Action for regular channel and ABS-CBN Sports+Action HD via livestream and Cable TV.The match commentators are Bob Guerrero and Armand Del Rosario.

Attendance
The match was attended by 120 people in Rizal Memorial Stadium. Some notable spectators are the FEU Lady Tamaraws Volleyball team, FEU Courtside Reporter Ganiel Krishnan, former Ateneo Blue Eagles basketball star Chris Newsome, and several players from the Ateneo Lady Eagles and Ateneo Blue Eagles Volleyball team.

Men's football final